Niccolò Sagundino (1402 – March 1464) was a Greek-born Venetian secretary, diplomat and humanist. He wrote numerous letters, as well as religious and philosophical treatises, mostly in Latin.

Originally from Euboea, he was in Venetian service when he was wounded and captured by the Ottomans at the fall of Thessaloniki in 1430. He favoured the union between the Catholic and Orthodox churches and worked for the Papacy. He undertook several Venetian missions to the Ottoman court and to Greek lands, on one of which he suffered a shipwreck that killed several of his immediate family. He died in Venice.

Life
Sagundino was born in 1402 to a Greek family in Chalkis, the capital of the Venetian kingdom of Negroponte. His father's name was Manuel. His mother's name is unknown. His family was originally from Constantinople and had two branches, one at Chalkis and another at Thessaloniki. They were citizens of Venice.

Sagundino received a classical education. He was in the employ of the Venetian state at Thessaloniki when the Ottomans captured the city in 1430. He was wounded in the assault and taken prisoner with his family. After his release, he served Venice as advocatus curiae in Chalkis from 1434 until 1437. In 1438, because of his fluency in both Greek and Latin, Sagundino was sent to the Council of Ferrara as an official translator. He remained through 1439, impressing the assembled clergy by his grasp of theology. He favoured the cause of church union.

After the council, Pope Eugenius IV employed Sagundino as an apostolic secretary on missions in Italy and Greece. This lasted probably until 1441. He returned to Chalkis in 1453 to serve as chancellor (cancelliere) to the bailo of Negroponte, the chief Venetian representative. At the same time he was still acting as a papal representative. After the fall of Constantinople to the Ottomans in that year, he was sent by Venice to negotiate with Sultan Mehmet II. He returned by 1455 with a report on Ottoman ambitions. In that year, Sagundino became a secretary to the doge.

Later in 1455, the republic sent Sagundino to deliver his report to Pope Nicholas V in Rome and King Alfonso V of Aragon in Naples. These embassies lasted until 1458, when he was appointed chancellor to the Duke of Crete. He set sail for Crete in July 1460, but the journey was cut short by a shipwreck that took the lives of his pregnant wife, two sons and a daughter and destroyed his books and many other possessions. He resigned his Cretan appointment, but was again appointed secretary to the doge, in which capacity he visited Methoni. He also undertook diplomatic missions to Constantinople and the Empire of Trebizond in 1460.

Sagundino died at Venice in March 1464, the exact day being uncertain. It is variously reported as 22 or 23 March, with a surviving notice of his death bearing a date of either 22 or 24 March. His son Giovanni having predeceased him, his heir was his son Ludovico and grandson Niccolò.

Works
Most of Sagundino's writings are in Latin. Few have been published. He left behind 66 letters to his family and other Italian humanists, one of them describing the shipwreck to Cardinal Bessarion, a fellow Greek Catholic. Among his notable correspondents were Ulisse degli Aleotti, Bishop Ermolao Barbaro, Antonio Beccadelli Panormita, Andrea Contrario, George of Trebizond and Zaccaria Trevisan. He wrote a consolatio on the death of Valerio Marcello, the young son of Jacopo Antonio Marcello.

Sagundino made Latin translations of the ancient Greek writers Arrian, Demosthenes, Onesander and Plutarch. He also wrote treatises on philosophy, theology and rhetoric. He dedicated a work on the doctrine of the Trinity, De deo, de unitate essentiae eius et de trinitate personarum, to Febo Capella, and another on philosophy, De origine et sectis pbilosophorum, to Fantino Coppo. In 1456, he was commissioned by Enea Silvio Piccolomini (the future Pope Pius II) to write a history of the Ottoman Empire, which resulted in his De familia otumanorum.

Notes

References

Bibliography

1402 births
1464 deaths
People from Chalcis
15th-century Greek people
15th-century Latin writers
15th-century Venetian writers
Diplomats of the Holy See
Ambassadors of the Republic of Venice to the Ottoman Empire
Venetian Renaissance humanists
Scholars of Ottoman history
15th-century Greek writers
15th-century Greek politicians